Both Sides is the fifth solo studio album by English singer-songwriter Phil Collins. Featuring an adult-oriented soft rock-based sound, the release came out in October 1993 by Atlantic in the US and in November by Virgin in the UK. Collins created the album entirely by himself, without any collaborations from outside songwriters and performers. The record received mixed-to-positive critical reviews, with Stephen Thomas Erlewine of AllMusic stating that the album's "artistically satisfying" songs feature "troubled, haunting tales".

Collins also went on the highly successful Both Sides of the World Tour upon its release. That effort involved over a hundred performances in a tour that went over a year.

A special two-disc edition of the album, featuring the Live from the Board – Official Bootleg EP, as a second disc, titled Far Side... of the World: Gold Souvenir Tour Edition, was released in Southeast Asia and Australia in 1995. A newly remastered, two-disc deluxe edition of the album was released on 29 January 2016, as part of the Take a Look at Me Now series of Collins's studio album reissues.

In a 2016 interview with The Guardian, Collins named Both Sides as his "favourite album from a songwriting and creative perspective". Collins also said: "It was very much a solo album. I played everything, the songs just streamed out of me, and as a writer, that's the kind of thing that you dream of. It was the second divorce! Personal relationships at that time were tangled, is a better way of saying it, and it all came very spontaneously."

Development
Both Sides was made by Collins entirely on his own, without usual collaborators producer Hugh Padgham, guitarist Daryl Stuermer, bassist Leland Sklar and the Phenix Horns. After recording demos at home, the album was finished in six weeks at the Farm with the help of producer/engineer Paul Gomersall. For the first and only time in his career, Collins played all the instruments himself, as well as taking care of the primary production duties. As a result, it is seen as his most personal album. "In the end I had 17 songs, and kicked out all those that did not fit that mood. As far as performance is concerned this has more heart and soul than anything I have done before."

In addition, Collins wrote sleeve notes explaining the meaning of each song, another first. Collins expresses both his feelings and personal problems and addresses political issues over the course of the album. He touches on politics and "the daily cloud of terrorism Britain seems to live under" on "We Wait and We Wonder", as well as a maturing disenchantment with the youth culture on "We're Sons of Our Fathers". The overall sound of Both Sides marked a return to the dark and melancholy style of his early albums Face Value and Hello, I Must Be Going!, which were largely grounded on the themes of relationship breakdown and loss. Mirroring the circumstances in which those albums were conceived, Collins' marriage to Jill Tavelman was also failing around the time that Both Sides was written.  About the influence of his emotions on his songs, he adds: "I have reached this point. Very intimate, very private songs seem to flow easily. I suddenly felt I had a lot to say."

Critical response
Both Sides was initially met with lukewarm reviews, particularly on adult contemporary radio, being criticised for its over-reliance on slow, dark and downbeat songs. The album was preceded by the title track as the first single, reaching no. 7 in the UK and no. 25 in the US (in a disappointing chart performance considering the lead singles from his two previous albums were no. 1 hits in America). The album itself was released weeks later, reaching to no. 13 in the US, though it still went platinum there. Both Sides was a hit in other European countries such as the UK (where it was the 8th biggest-selling album of 1993, despite only being available for the final eight weeks of the year), Germany & Switzerland, reaching no. 1 all over Europe, but with a limited success, due to the lack of hit singles. The ballad "Everyday", released in early 1994, was another Top 20 hit in the UK, peaking at no. 15, and became the biggest hit single from the album in the US, reaching no. 24 on the Billboard Hot 100 and no. 2 on the Adult Contemporary chart. The third and last single, "We Wait and We Wonder" — a political anthem — reached no. 45 in the UK.

However, over time the album's reputation gradually improved, and reviews for the 2016 reissue were considerably more positive, AllMusic's Stephen Thomas Erlewine rated it 4 out of 5 stars and commended Collins' stepping out of big pop hooks and embracing an introspective art rock style for this album, which he saw as "quietly compelling". On Goldmine magazine's review, Patrick Prince gave the album 3.5 stars, praising the melancholic style of the album as a welcome return to material similar to Face Value, although he criticized the ballads "Everyday" and "There's a Place For Us", saying they are "as bad as any sappy movie soundtrack cut ready to be forgotten".

Track listing
All songs written, performed and produced by Phil Collins.

Unreleased tracks
Several instrumental tracks were recorded and subsequently released as extra tracks on both singles for "Everyday" and "We Wait and We Wonder". These instrumental tracks include "Rad Dudeski" and "Don't Call Me Ashley". In addition, there were other various B-sides that were released from the Both Sides sessions ("Take Me with You", "For a Friend") and a few cover songs that made it on other various albums.
"For a Friend" was written as a tribute to Collins's longtime friend, saxophonist Don Myrick, who was wrongfully killed by a policeman in Los Angeles while Collins was composing the album. Myrick had played sax solos on Collins's songs "If Leaving Me Is Easy", "The West Side", "One More Night" and "All of My Life".

There has been discussion about a song called "Deep Water Town". It is from the Both Sides sessions and did not make the cut, was never released nor widely circulated amongst collectors. A very early "demo" of it was released on the official fanclub website in 2011. It is more of an improvisation from which only a part of the chorus made it to the completed track. This completed track features an atmospheric drum machine, keyboard sounds (no piano) and vocals by Collins telling a story about a disaster at sea and families left behind.

In November 2004, Collins himself commented on the song on the forum of his old official website:
"DEEP WATER TOWN...again I scratch my head and ask how did someone get it... I don't think it was ever released, or am I going slowly senile. It was a pretty song about a disaster at sea, and the families left behind. Obviously one of my more cheerful pre-divorce moments. Circa Both Sides...."

The Both Sides of the World Tour

Although Both Sides failed to reach the same heights as ...But Seriously and No Jacket Required, the supporting tour was a huge success. It was a 13-month tour, which saw over 150 performances on over 6 continents.

Personnel

Musicians 
All instruments performed by Phil Collins.

Production 
 Produced by Phil Collins
 Engineered by Paul Gomersall
 Assistant engineer – Mark Robinson
 Recorded at home on 12 tk (PC engineering) with additional overdubs recorded at The Farm (Surrey, England).
 Mastered by Bob Ludwig at Gateway Mastering (Portland, Maine, US).
 Continuous surveillance by Geoff Callingham and Mike Bowen
 Cover photography by Trevor Key
 Artwork – Hills Archer Ink

Charts

Weekly charts

Year-end

Certifications

References

1993 albums
Phil Collins albums
Atlantic Records albums
Albums produced by Phil Collins